The eastern black-crested gibbon (Nomascus nasutus), also known as the Cao-vit black crested gibbon or the Cao-vit crested gibbon, is a species of gibbon from southeast China and northern Vietnam. The term "Cao-vit" originated from the sounds of their calls or songs that villagers of Ngoc Khe, Phong Nam and Ngoc Con communes of Trung Khanh District, Cao Bang Province of Vietnam use to name for them. This name was officially used by gibbon experts since the rediscovery.

From the 1960s until the 2000s there had been no confirmed sightings of the eastern black-crested gibbon and it was thought to be possibly extinct. In 2002 a small population was rediscovered by two FFI biologists in a karst forest of Trùng Khánh District, Cao Bằng Province, in northeast Vietnam. The species was endemic to Vietnam until 2006 when they were also found in a small forest in Guangxi Province of China, which is adjacent to Trung Khanh forests. In 2005 it was estimated that this population in Vietnam side was about 35-37 individuals.

The eastern black crested gibbon is one of the rarest and most critically endangered primates in the world. This status has resulted from deforestation of its habitat, encroachment, and poaching.

Taxonomy 

The eastern black crested gibbon is classified as separate from other crested gibbons based on molecular data, fur coloration, and differences in vocal communication. Previously it had been considered conspecific with the Hainan black crested gibbon or as a subspecies of the black crested gibbon. Until the sequencing of the mitochondrial cytochrome b gene the Hainan black crested gibbon was thought to be Nomascus nasutus hainanus, a subspecies of eastern black crested gibbon. The researchers proposed that the genetic separation showed it was a distinct species.

References 

eastern black crested gibbon
Primates of East Asia
Primates of Southeast Asia
Mammals of China
Mammals of Vietnam
Critically endangered fauna of Asia
eastern black crested gibbon
Species endangered by deforestation
Taxa named by Philippe Alexandre Jules Künckel d'Herculais

it:Nomascus concolor#Sottospecie